Robert Coverdale (16 January 1892 – 7 January 1959) was an English professional footballer who played as a wing half in the Football League for Sunderland, Hull City and Grimsby Town.

References

1892 births
1959 deaths
People from West Hartlepool
Footballers from Hartlepool
English footballers
Association football wing halves
Rutherglen Glencairn F.C. players
Sunderland A.F.C. players
Hull City A.F.C. players
Hull City A.F.C. wartime guest players
Grimsby Town F.C. players
Bridlington Town A.F.C. players
English Football League players
Scottish Junior Football Association players
Durham Light Infantry soldiers
British Army personnel of World War I